Orlando Montenegro Medrano (15 May 1920 – 29 October 1988) was a Nicaraguan politician and attorney who served as acting President of Nicaragua in 1966, following the death of President René Schick. He also served Ambassador of Nicaragua to the United Nations through the 1960s and 1970s, and the president of the lower chamber of National Congress of Nicaragua 1966–1967 and 1968–1972. He also served as Mayor of Managua from 1976 to 1979.

References

1988 deaths
Presidents of Nicaragua
Presidents of the Chamber of Deputies (Nicaragua)
Nationalist Liberal Party politicians
1920 births
Nicaraguan expatriates in the United States
Ambassadors of Nicaragua
Mayors of Managua